Siri Dokken (born 5 July 1966) is a Norwegian illustrator.

Dokken was born in Bærum, and attended the Norwegian National Academy of Craft and Art Industry. She worked for the newspaper Dag og Tid from 1994 and then for Dagsavisen since 1995. She won the Swedish EWK Prize in 2005 and the Editorial Cartoon of the Year award in 2007 and 2011.

References

1966 births
Living people
Norwegian illustrators
Norwegian editorial cartoonists
People from Bærum
Oslo National Academy of the Arts alumni